Tecoma fulva is a species of flowering plant native to South America. In the past, several species have been named, which are more recently considered to be subspecies.

 Tecoma fulva subsp. fulva
 Tecoma fulva subsp. altoandina J. R. I. Wood
 Tecoma fulva subsp. arequipensis (Sprague) J.R.I.Wood	
 Tecoma fulva subsp. garrocha (Hieron.) J.R.I.Wood	
 Tecoma fulva subsp. guarume (DC.) J.R.I.Wood	
 Tecoma fulva subsp. tanaeciiflora (Kraenzl.) J.R.I.Wood

References

fulva
Flora of South America
Garden plants